was a town located in Hioki District, Kagoshima Prefecture, Japan.

As of 2003, the town had an estimated population of 9,833 and the density of 101.38 persons per km². The total area was 96.99 km².

On May 1, 2005, Fukiage, along with the towns of Higashiichiki, Hiyoshi and Ijūin (all from Hioki District), was merged to create the city of Hioki and no longer exists as an independent municipality.

External links 
 Official website of Hioki 

Dissolved municipalities of Kagoshima Prefecture